Gaultheria nummularioides is a species of plant in the family Ericaceae. It is distributed across India, Myanmar, Nepal, Bhutan, Indonesia, and Southwest China (Tibet, Yunnan, and Sichuan). This species has been cultivated as an ornamental in Britain, the United States, and elsewhere for some decades.

Synonyms
 Gaultheria nummularioides D.Don var. microphylla C.Y.Wu et T.Z.Hsu

References

 

nummularioides